A list of notable LGBT rights activists who have worked to advance LGBT rights by political change, legal action or publication. Ordered by country, alphabetically.

Argentina
Claudia Castrosín Verdú, she and her partner were the first lesbian couple to form a civil union in Latin America; vice president of FALGBT
María Rachid, politician and LGBT rights activist, partner of Claudia Castrosín Verdú
Diana Sacayán, board member of the International Lesbian, Gay, Bisexual, Trans and Intersex Association and a leader of the Antidiscrimination Liberation Movement

Australia
 Ron Austin
 Peter Bonsall-Boone
 Bob Brown
 Lyle Chan, member of ACT UP
 Rodney Croome
Peter De Waal
 Craig Johnston (politician)
 Julie McCrossin
Michael Kirby (judge), Justice of the High Court of Australia

Austria 
 Helmut Graupner
 Gery Keszler, organiser of the Life Ball
 Alex Jürgen
 Ulrike Lunacek

Bangladesh
 Xulhaz Mannan

Belize 
 Derricia Castillo-Salazar
 Caleb Orozco

Brazil
 Luiz Mott
 Jean Wyllys
 Toni Reis
 João Silvério Trevisan
 Míriam Martinho

Bulgaria
 Desislava Petrova

Cameroon
 Joel Gustave Nana Ngongang
 Alice Nkom

Canada
Alec Butler
Michelle Douglas
Jim Egan
Brent Hawkes
George Hislop
K.d. Lang
 Irshad Manji
 Christin Milloy
Arsham Parsi
 Svend Robinson
 Bill Siksay
 Clara Sorrenti
 Jenna Talackova
 Mark Tewksbury

Chile
 Luis Larraín
 Pedro Lemebel
 Jaime Parada
 Pablo Salvador

China, People's Republic of
Li Tingting, LGBT rights and feminist activist
Li Yinhe
Cui Zi'en
Xian, LGBT rights activist and founder of Beijing-based lesbian organization Tongyu

Colombia
Virgilio Barco Isakson (b. 1965)
Armando Benedetti Villaneda (b. 1962)
Blanca Inés Durán Hernández
Angélica Lozano Correa
Tatiana de la Tierra
Juliana Delgado Lopera

Denmark 
 Axel Axgil
 Lili Elbe (b. 1882 as Einar Magnus Andreas Wegner)

Egypt
Ismail Mohamed (activist)
Maher Sabry
Omar Sharif Jr.
Sarah Hegazi
Shrouk El-Attar

Estonia
 Lisette Kampus
 Peeter Rebane

Finland
 Sakris Kupila
 Sofi Oksanen

France
 Camille Cabral
Pierre Guénin
 Christiane Taubira
 Lilian Thuram, former French soccer player
Rama Yade, former Secretary of State for Foreign Affairs and Human Rights of France

Germany
Adolf Brand
Manfred Bruns
Volker Beck
Benedict Friedlaender
 Magnus Hirschfeld
 Karl Heinrich Ulrichs

India
Anand Grover
Menaka Guruswamy
Laxmi Narayan Tripathi
Anjali Gopalan
Gopi Shankar Madurai
Manvendra Singh Gohil
Harish Iyer
Ashok Row Kavi
Sridhar Rangayan
Rose Venkatesan

Indonesia 
 Dede Oetomo

Iran
 Alireza Shojaian
 Arsham Parsi
 Elham Malekpoor
 Shadi Amin

Iraq
 Amir Ashour
 Zhiar Ali

Israel
Imri Kalmann, former co-chairperson of the Israeli LGBT Association
Yair Qedar, founder of Israel's first LGBT newspaper
 Apollo Braun, the first man who waved the pride flag inside of Sheikh Zayed Grand Mosque in Abu Dhabi.

Ireland
Mary Dorcey
Lydia Foy
David Norris
Tonie Walsh
 Katherine Zappone

Italy
 Franco Grillini
 Vladimir Luxuria
Imma Battaglia

Japan
Taiga Ishikawa
Wataru Ishizaka
Maki Muraki (born 1974), head of Nijiro Diversity in Osaka
Kanako Otsuji, first openly lesbian politician in Japan

Kenya 
 Denis Nzioka
 Edwin Chiloba

Kyrgyzstan
Dastan Kasmamytov

Lithuania
 Romas Zabarauskas
 Marija Aušrinė Pavilionienė

Lebanon
 Georges Azzi
 Hamed Sinno
 Sandra Melhem

Mexico
 Patria Jiménez
 Nancy Cardenas, playwright, director, and LGBT+ activist
 Agnés Torres Hernández, psychologist and transgender activist

Nepal
 Sunil Babu Pant, first openly gay Nepali politician, former head of Blue Diamond Society
Bhumika Shrestha

Netherlands 
 Willem Arondeus
 Vera Bergkamp, former chairman of the world's oldest LGBT organization
 John Blankenstein
 Boris Dittrich
 Coos Huijsen, first openly gay parliamentarian
 Henk Krol
 Marjan Sax

New Zealand 
 Georgina Beyer, first openly transgender mayor in NZ.
 Suran Dickson
 Kevin Hague
 Ngahuia Te Awekotuku

Nigeria 

 Bisi Alimi
 Matthew Blaise, activist involved in End SARS

Philippines
 Tonette Lopez
 Boy Abunda

Poland 
Robert Biedroń
Anna Grodzka
Krzysztof Garwatowski
 Krystian Legierski
 Paweł Leszkowicz
 Szymon Niemiec

Russia
 Nikolai Alekseev
 Ali Feruz
 Igor Kochetkov, head of the LGBT Network
 Yekaterina Samutsevich
 Evgeny Shtorn
Mikhail Tumasov
Yulia Tsvetkova

Serbia 
 Dejan Nebrigić
 Jelena Karleuša

Sierra Leone
 FannyAnn Eddy

Singapore 
Alex Au
Paddy Chew, first person in Singapore to come out as HIV-positive
Jean Chong

Somalia 
 Amal Aden
 Sumaya Dalmar

South Africa
Abdurrazack "Zackie" Achmat
Dawn Cavanagh
Busi Khewsa
Simon Nkoli, LGBT activist, founder of the Gay and Lesbian Organisation of the Witwatersrand
Noxolo Nogwaza
Funeka Soldaat, leader of Free Gender Organisation in Khayelitsha, Western Cape
Midi Achmat, LGBT activist, co-founder of Treatment Action Campaign (TAC), Association of Bisexuals, Gays, and Lesbians (ABIGALE) and the National Coalition of Lesbian and Gay Equality (NCLGE)

Spain
 Oriol Pamies
 Ángeles Álvarez 
 Carla Antonelli

Sri Lanka 
 Rosanna Flamer-Caldera

Sudan 

 Ahmed Umar

Syria
 Abdulrahman Akkad

Taiwan
 Josephine Ho
 Chi Chia-wei

Trinidad and Tobago 
Jason Jones
 Jowelle de Souza

Tunisia 

 Mounir Baatour

Turkey

 Barış Sulu
 Çağla Akalın
 Demet Demir
 Hande Kader
 Mehmet Tarhan
 Yasemin Öz

Uganda 
 David Kato
 Kasha Nabagesera
 Pepe Julian Onziema

Ukraine 

 Bogdan Globa, Ukrainian human and LGBT rights activist
 Vitalina Koval, LGBTI human rights defender in Ukraine

United Kingdom
Jeremy Bentham, 19th-century jurist, philosopher, and legal and social reformer.
 Bette Bourne, actor, performer, founder of the Gay theatrical troupe Bloolips, and one of the first modern-day UK LGBTQ+ activists and campaigners.
 Christine Burns, trans rights campaigner, formerly a vice president of PfC, awarded MBE for work with PfC and on the GRB
 Tanya Compas, queer Black rights activist based in London
 A.E. Dyson, literary critic and founder of the Homosexual Law Reform Society
 Jackie Forster, actress, TV personality and lesbian campaigner
 Ray Gosling, writer, broadcaster and gay rights activist in the Campaign for Homosexual Equality.
 Antony Grey, Secretary of the Homosexual Law Reform Society; the public face of the Albany Trust
 Liam Hackett, founder of anti-bullying website and charity Ditch the Label
 Derek Jarman, film director
 Paris Lees, trans rights campaigner, part of Trans Media Watch
 Denis Lemon, Editor of Gay News, involved in blasphemy prosecution brought by Mary Whitehouse
Andrew Moffat, LGBT education advocate, author and founder the No Outsiders programme
 Ian McKellen, actor and spokesperson for Stonewall (UK)
 Robert Mellors, 20th-century writer and Gay Liberation Front campaigner
Phyll Opoku-Gyimah, British political activist and co-founder of UK Black Pride
 Paul Patrick, anti-homophobia activist and educator
Saima Razzaq, LGBT inclusive education activist and Birmingham Pride Head of Diversity and Inclusion
 Michael Schofield, sociologist and early gay rights campaigner
 Michael Steed, Liberal politician, academic and gay rights activist in the Campaign for Homosexual Equality
 Ben Summerskill, former chief executive of Stonewall
 Peter Tatchell, politician, human rights and LGBT rights campaigner
 Stephen Whittle, trans rights campaigner and former vice president of PfC and president of HBIGDA, Law Professor at MMU, awarded OBE for work with PfC and on the GRB

United States
 Kimball Allen, author of Secrets of a Gay Mormon Felon and Be Happy Be Mormon
 Jacob Appel, New York City-based lawyer, advocate for reparations for gays and lesbians
 Gilbert Baker (1951–2017), designer of the rainbow flag
 Christopher R. Barron, co-founder of GOProud, a political organization representing gay conservatives
 Vic Basile, first executive director of the Human Rights Campaign
 Wayne Besen, founder of Truth Wins Out, former spokesman for the Human Rights Campaign
 Elizabeth Birch, former executive director of the Human Rights Campaign
 Dustin Lance Black, founding board member of the American Foundation for Equal Rights
 Chaz Bono, transgender son of Sonny Bono and Cher
 Jennifer Finney Boylan (1958 - ), transgender author, professor, and trans rights activist, former co-chair of GLAAD's National Board of Directors.
 David P. Brill (1955–1979), Boston-based journalist
 Blake Brockington (1996–2014), African American transgender rights activist.
 Judith Butler, philosopher and gender theorist
 Margarethe Cammermeyer, former colonel in the Washington National Guard whose coming out story was made into the 1995 movie Serving in Silence
 Gloria Casarez (1971–2014), Latina lesbian civil rights leader and LGBT activist in Philadelphia. Philadelphia's first director of lesbian, gay, bisexual and transgender (LGBT) affairs.
 Ryan Cassata, American transgender activist, public speaker and singer-songwriter
 June Chan, Asian American lesbian activist
 RuPaul Andre Charles, known as RuPaul, American drag queen and gay activist known for the TV show RuPaul's Drag Race
 Madonna Louise Ciccone, known as Madonna (born 1958), entertainer and long-term human and civil rights activist; has offered outspoken support for the gay rights movement
 Joanne Conte, trans woman, former Arvada, Colorado City Councilor, currently hosts a radio show on KGNU
 Lynn Conway, trans woman computer scientist and electrical engineer
 Ruby Corado, Salvadoran activist and founder of Casa Ruby
James Dale, known for landmark US Supreme Court case Boy Scouts of America v. Dale (2000) that challenged the Boy Scouts of America policy of excluding gay youth and adults
Alphonso David (born 1970), the first person of color to serve as president for the Human Rights Campaign, as of August 2019, served as a staff attorney for Lambda Legal where he worked on New York State's first same-sex marriage case, Hernandez v. Robles also the Former Deputy Secretary and Counsel for Civil Rights for New York State under Andrew Cuomo
 Ellen DeGeneres (26 January 1958, Metairie, Louisiana), American comedian, television host, actress, writer, producer, and LGBT activist
 Stephen Donaldson (1946–1996), early bisexual LGBT rights activist founder of the first American gay students' organization, first person to fight a discharge from the U.S. military for homosexuality, also an important figure in the modern bisexual rights movement
 Julie Dorf (born 1965, Milwaukee, Wisconsin), international LGBT human rights advocate and founder of OutRight Action International
 Fran Drescher, (born 1957, Flushing, New York) is an outspoken healthcare advocate and LGBT rights activist.
 John Duran, LGBT and AIDS activist, served as Mayor and Council member of West Hollywood, California; founding board member of ANGLE (Access Now for Gay and Lesbian Equality); served as President of the Board of Directors of Equality California (EQCA); past board member of the ACLU, Lambda Legal Defense, and the National Gay and Lesbian Task Force
 Danielle Egnew (born 1969), lesbian musician, actress, producer, and psychic who endorsed and provided campaign materials to Virginia's VoteNO campaign, protecting the legalities of same-sex civil unions in Virginia—also Spiritual leader and founder of The Church of the Open Christ, an inclusive and progressive LGBT ministry
 Steve Endean, (1948–1993), founder of the Human Rights Campaign Fund
 Arden Eversmeyer (born 1931), Founder of Lesbians Over Age Fifty (LOAF) and the Old Lesbian Oral Herstory Project (OLOHP)
 Matt Foreman (born 1953), Executive Director of the National Gay and Lesbian Task Force (NGLTF)
 Barney Frank (born 1940), member of the Democratic Party who served as a member of Congress from Massachusetts from 1981 to 2013
 Aaron Fricke (born 1962), sued the Cumberland, Rhode Island school system in 1980 and won a landmark First Amendment case granting him the legal right to attend prom with another boy, an experience he chronicled in the gay coming-of-age memoir Reflections of a Rock Lobster
 Lady Gaga, bisexual singer/songwriter who campaigned for the DADT repeal; released pro-gay anthem "Born This Way" (2011)
Allen Ginsberg (1926–1997), Beat poet and political activist.
 Barbara Gittings (1932–2007), founder of the New York City chapter of the Daughters of Bilitis who also pushed for the American Psychological Association to remove homosexuality from its list of mental disorders in the Diagnostic and Statistical Manual of Mental Disorders (DSM).
 Neil Giuliano (born 1956), openly gay mayor of Tempe, Arizona (1994–2004) and current President of GLAAD
 Chad Griffin (born 1973), Former president of the Human Rights Campaign , and founder of American Foundation for Equal Rights, a nonprofit organization that supports the plaintiffs in the California Proposition 8 trial
 James Gruber (1928—2011), original member of the Mattachine Society
 Hardy Haberman, author, filmmaker, prominent member of the Leather/Fetish/BDSM community, and activist involved in founding of first LGBT group in Dallas, TX
 David M. Hall, author of Allies at Work: Creating a Lesbian, Gay, Bisexual and Transgender Inclusive Work Environment, speaks to corporate audiences across the country, co-founder of Out & Equal Philadelphia.
 Harry Hay (1912–2002), co-founder of the Mattachine Society
 John Heilman, Councilmember of West Hollywood from 1984–present.
 Essex Hemphill (1957–1995), African American poet
 Daniel Hernandez Jr. (born 1990), member of Tucson's city commission on gay, lesbian, bisexual and transgender issues, who was credited with saving the life of U.S. Representative Gabby Giffords after the 2011 Tucson shooting
 Brenda Howard (1946–2005), bisexual LGBT rights activist, an instrumental figure in the immediate post-Stonewall era in New York City, also an important figure in the modern bisexual rights movement
 John Paul Hudson (1929–2002), activist, journalist, actor, and author; helped organize NYC's first gay pride parade following the Stonewall riots, serving as the parade's first grand marshal
 Sally Huffer (born 1965), board member of multiple LGBT non profit organizations
 Richard Isay (1934–2012) psychiatrist, psychoanalyst, author and gay activist; responsible for ending discrimination against gay people by the American Psychoanalytic Association; wrote "Being Homosexual: Gay Men and their Development", widely considered a groundbreaking work
 Janet Jackson (born 1966), American singer, songwriter, and actress
 Cheryl Jacques (born 1962), former member of the Massachusetts State Legislature and the president of the Human Rights Campaign from January through November 2004. She resigned from this post less than a month after the passage of 11 state constitutional amendments banning gay marriage.
 Helen G. James, American equality activist 
 Dale Jennings (1917–2000), co-founder of the Mattachine Society
 Marsha P. Johnson (1945–1992) was an American gay liberation activist and transgender woman. Known as an outspoken advocate for gay rights, Johnson was one of the prominent figures in the Stonewall uprising of 1969.
 Cleve Jones (born 1954), conceived the NAMES Project AIDS Memorial Quilt and worked with Harvey Milk; co-founded the San Francisco AIDS Foundation
Christine Jorgensen (1926–1989), first person to become widely known for having sex reassignment surgery in the United States
 Frank Kameny (1925–2011), participant in many gay rights rallies of the 1960s and 1970s, most notably the push in 1972–1973 for the American Psychological Association to remove homosexuality from its list of mental disorders in the Diagnostic and Statistical Manual of Mental Disorders (DSM)
 Norm Kent (born 1949), publisher of the South Florida Gay News and nationally respected constitutional rights and criminal defense attorney, the former chair of the National Organization for the Reform of Marijuana Laws and radio talk show host
Morris Kight (1919–2003), founder of Los Angeles' Gay and Lesbian Front and Los Angeles Gay and Lesbian Center
 Lisa Kove (born 1958), Executive Director of the Department of Defense Federal Globe and President of Empowering Spirits Foundation
 Larry Kramer (1935–2020), author and playwright who helped form the prominent gay rights organizations Gay Men's Health Crisis and AIDS Coalition to Unleash Power (ACT-UP)
 Janice Langbehn (born 1968), campaigner for same-sex marriage and same-sex hospital visitation after being denied access to her dying partner, Lisa Marie Pond, in 2007
 Cyndi Lauper (born 1953), founder of the True Colors Fund charity which promotes equality for members of the LGBT community
 Malcolm L. Lazin (born 1943), founder and executive director of Equality Forum and LGBT History Month, executive producers of three LGBT documentary films, organizer of the LGBT 50th Anniversary Celebration at Independence Hall on 4 July 2015, executive producer of the off-Broadway play 217 Boxes of Dr. Henry Anonymous and overseer of the largest number of government approved, nationally significant LGBT Historic Markers
 Audre Lorde (born 1934), A self-described “black, lesbian, mother, warrior, poet,” Audre Lorde dedicated both her life and her creative talent to confronting and addressing injustices of racism, sexism, classism, and homophobia. Lorde was born in New York City to West Indian immigrant parents. 
 Courtney Love (born 1964), a musician and singer, has advocated for LGBT rights and acceptance since the beginning of her career in the early 1990s
 Scott Long (born 1963), Executive Director of the Lesbian, Gay, Bisexual, and Transgender Rights Program at Human Rights Watch.
 Phyllis Lyon (1924–2020), lesbian activist who co-founded the Daughters of Bilitis with longtime partner Del Martin
 Del Martin (1921–2008), lesbian activist who co-founded the Daughters of Bilitis with longtime partner Phyllis Lyon
 Tim McFeeley, former executive director of the Human Rights Campaign, 1989–1995
 Harvey Milk (1930–1978), openly gay city supervisor of San Francisco, California who was assassinated (along with mayor George Moscone) in 1978 by Dan White
 David Nelson (born 1962), founder of Gay and Lesbian Utah Democrats, and Stonewall Shooting Sports of Utah.
 Gavin Newsom (born 1967), heterosexual mayor of San Francisco, California, who directed his office to issue wedding licenses to same-sex couples in February 2004, although this process was halted the next month by the California Supreme Court
 Jack Nichols (1937–2005), journalist, writer, activist and co-founder of the Mattachine Society of Washington D.C. with Frank Kameny
Tyler Oakley (born 1989, Jackson, Michigan) is an openly gay American LGBTQ+ rights activist, YouTuber, and author; he also focuses on social issues such as health care, education, and suicide prevention
 Romaine Patterson (1978–), lesbian talk show host and founder of Angel Action
 Troy Perry (1940–), founder of UFMCC, an international Protestant Christian denomination with a specific outreach to lesbian, gay, bisexual, and transgender families and communities
 Charles Pitts (1941–2015), co-founder of the Gay Liberation Front in New York City and host of influential early gay radio programs on WBAI
 Sylvia Rivera (1951–2002), gay liberation and trans activist, founding member of the Gay Liberation Front and the Gay Activists Alliance 
 Brandan Robertson (1992–). LGBT rights activist in evangelical communities, writer on intersection of faith and LGBT issues
 Geena Rocero, transgender model and advocate; founder of Gender Proud, an advocacy and aid organization that stands up for the right of transgender people globally
 Craig Rodwell (1940–1993), gay rights activist; founder of first gay & lesbian oriented bookshop in the United States; proposed and organized Annual Reminder; proposed and organized New York's Gay Pride march, then called Christopher Street Liberation day; was a founding member and organizer of Gay People In Christian Science.
Abby Rubenfeld (born 1953), gay rights activist and attorney; she successfully challenged the sodomy law in Tennessee and she filed the lawsuit that led to Tennessee's inclusion in the U.S. Supreme Court case that legalized gay marriage nationwide
 Vito Russo (11 July 1946 – 7 November 1990) was an LGBT activist, film historian and author who is best remembered as the author of the book The Celluloid Closet (1981, revised edition 1987).
 Bayard Rustin (1912–1987), openly gay civil rights activist, principal organizer and co-leader of the 1963 March on Washington for Jobs and Freedom and advisor to Martin Luther King Jr.; gay rights activist in later life
 Ryan Sallans (born 1979), out trans man and public speaker – travels around US educating high school and college students on LGBT issues
 José Sarria (born 1922 or 1923), first openly gay candidate for political office in the United States, founder of the Imperial Court System
 Tully Satre (born 1989), blogger who gained fame in March 2006 for challenging then-Senator George Allen
 Dan Savage (born 1964), columnist of Savage Love and author, founder of the It Gets Better Project.
 Josh Seefried, United States Air Force first lieutenant and co-director of OutServe, the association of actively serving LGBT military.
 Michelangelo Signorile (born 1960), gay American writer and a US and Canadian national talk radio host.
 Charles Silverstein (1935–2023), gay psychologist who was the founder of the Journal of Homosexuality and key in testifying against the classification of homosexuality as a mental disorder.
 Ruth Simpson (1926–2008), founder of the first lesbian community center, former President of Daughters of Bilitis New York, author of From the Closet to the Courts
 Joe Solmonese (born 1965), former political fundraiser and past president of the Human Rights Campaign
 A. Latham Staples (born 1977), founder and Chairman of the Empowering Spirits Foundation, current President & CEO of EXUSMED, Inc.
 Abby Stein (born 1991) is an American advocate for transgender people of Orthodox Jewish background
 Lou Sullivan (1951–1991), first openly gay trans man whose work is responsible for the understanding that sexual orientation and gender identity are distinct and unrelated concepts.
 Andy Thayer (Born 1960) is an American socialist and gay rights activist, and co-founder of the Gay Liberation Network
 Urvashi Vaid (1958–2022) is an Indian-American activist who has worked for over 25 years promoting civil rights for gay, lesbian, bisexual and transgender persons.
 Phill Wilson (born 1956, Chicago, Illinois), co-founder of the National Black Lesbian & Gay Leadership Forum and founder of The Black AIDS Institute.
 Evan Wolfson (born 1957), the founder and president of Freedom to Marry, a group favoring same-sex marriage in the United States.
William E. Woods (1949–2008), a gay rights activist in Hawaii who in 1991 set in motion the legalization of same-sex marriage in the United States.
 Chely Wright (born 1970, Wellsville, Kansas), first openly lesbian country music singer; focused on serving as a role model and mentor for children and teens in order to reduce gay related suicides in children.
 Kiyoshi Kuromiya (1943–2000), author and civil rights, anti-war, gay liberation, and HIV/AIDS activist.

See also

 List of LGBT rights organizations

References

Further reading
 

 
LGBT rights activists
Activists